Bai Koblo Pathbana II,  was a paramount chief and politician in Lunsar, Port Loko District, Sierra Leone. He was crowned the 43rd Paramount Chief of Marampa-Masimera Chiefdom in 1943.

In 1946, he married Ella Gulama, the daughter of Julius Gulama, Paramount Chief of Kaiyamba District and ruler of the largest Mende chiefdom in Sierra Leone. Their marriage was a significant cross-tribal union marriage between an ethnic Temne and an ethnic Mende, the two most powerful clans in Sierra Leone.

Pathbana became a Cabinet Minister without Portfolio in the All People's Congress government led by Siaka Stevens in 1967. The post had been held by his wife Ella in the previous administration of Sir Albert Margai.

He was awarded a Member of the Order of the British Empire MBE and Commander of the Order of the British Empire (CBE)in the 1969 New Year Honours.

Marriage and family
On 27 April 1946, he married Ella Gulama in a grand ceremony in Moyamba. Dr. Milton Margai spoke at the reception.

At the time of their marriage Ella was a 25 year-old graduate of the teachers' training college in Freetown. As she was both well educated and well travelled, Pathbana allowed her to accompany him to official functions. As his Chief Consort, she created education opportunities for women and girls in the Masimera Chiefdom and became a popular figure.

Together they had seven children but only three, Francis Obai Kabia, Soccoh Kabia and Jilo Kabia, survived into adulthood. After several years, his wife returned to Moyamba, the seat of her father's chiefdom. She never returned to Pathbana and explaining that she was unhappy in the marriage.

It is customary for Paramount Chief's in Sierra Leone practice polygamy, with their first spouse being a so-called "big wife" while the term "junior wife" is used to refer to their other spouses. In addition to his marriage to Ella, Pathbana was married to 16 other women and had a great number children with them.

See also
 Obai
 Paramount Chief Ella Koblo Gulama, OBE, GCOR
 Soccoh Kabia
 Francis Obai Kabia
 Brigadier David Lansana
 Komeh Gulama Lansana

References

External links
Sierra Leone Powers Lost - Interview with Chief Gulama, By Syl Cheney-Coker, Worldview Magazine, Fall 1999
The life and Times of Honourable PC Madam Ella Koblo Gulama of Sierra Leone By Awareness Times, September 26, 2006
Tribute to the Honourable PC Ella Koblo Gulama, Sierra Connection
Women Leaders In Africa

African royalty
All People's Congress politicians
Commanders of the Order of the British Empire
Government ministers of Sierra Leone
Sierra Leonean nobility
Sierra Leonean royalty
1912 births
1998 deaths